Wenzhou Longwan International Airport  is the airport serving the city of Wenzhou in southern Zhejiang Province, China. Formerly called Wenzhou Yongqiang Airport, it adopted the current name on 25 April 2013.

In 2010, Wenzhou airport was the 28th busiest airport in mainland China with 5,326,802 passengers.

History
The airport was opened for civil service on July 12, 1990. The construction cost was RMB 132.5 million dollars and was funded by Wenzhou's municipal government.

Facilities
The airport can handle aircraft as large as the Boeing 767 and Airbus A330. The departure lounge occupies  in area.

New terminal
Construction of the new Terminal 2 officially began on 11 November 2011. It will have an area of 100,000 square meters, four times as big as the existing Terminal 1, and will be able to handle 13 million passengers per year. When completed it will be used exclusively for domestic flights, while Terminal 1 will be converted to a dedicated international terminal. Terminal 2 is the centerpiece of the new Wenzhou Comprehensive Transportation Hub development which also includes a long-distance bus terminal, subway station, as well as commercial real estate.

Airlines and destinations

Passenger

Accidents and incidents
 On 20 March 2011 China Eastern Airlines flight MU5577 from Shanghai Hongqiao Airport clipped trees on approach at Longwan Airport.

See also
List of airports in China
List of the busiest airports in China

References

Airports in Zhejiang
Transport in Wenzhou
Airports established in 1990
1990 establishments in China